Epoetin theta, sold under the brand name Biopoin among others, is a copy of the human hormone erythropoietin.

The most common side effects include shunt thrombosis (clots that can form in blood vessels of patients on dialysis, a blood clearance technique), headache, hypertension (high blood pressure), hypertensive crisis (sudden, dangerously high blood pressure), skin reactions, arthralgia (joint pain) and influenza (flu)-like illness.Epoetin theta was approved for medical use in the European Union in October 2009. It is on the World Health Organization's List of Essential Medicines.

Medical uses 
Epoetin theta is indicated for the treatment of symptomatic anemia in adults.

References 

attribution contains material copied from Biopoin | European Medicines Agency https://www.ema.europa.eu/en/medicines/human/EPAR/biopoin 2021

External links 
 

Antianemic preparations
Recombinant proteins